Events in the year 1927 in Turkey.

Parliament
 2nd Parliament of Turkey (up to 1 September)
 3rd Parliament of Turkey (from 1 September)

Incumbents
President – Kemal Atatürk
Prime Minister – İsmet İnönü

Ruling party and the main opposition
 Ruling party – Republican People's Party (CHP)

Cabinet
4th government of Turkey (up to 1 November)
5th government of Turkey (from 1 November)

Events
18 January – United States senate rejected the Treaty of Lausanne
 1 February – General elections
7 March – End of the Independence Tribunals
1 July – President Kemal Atatürk visited Istanbul. First visit after 1917. (To establish Ankara as the new capital, he had purposely delayed his visit.) 
 27 August – A group of gangs led Hacı Sami entered Turkey via Samos (in Greece) to create chaos, but they were arrested
 7 September – International court supported Turkish point of view on the Bozkurt–Lotus case (see 1926 in Turkey). Turkish lawyer Mahmut Esat was later surnamed Bozkurt
 15 October – Kemal Atatürk in a six-day speech, called Nutuk, summarized the events in Turkish War of Independence
 19 October – Kemal Atatürk’s will. CHP was the main beneficiary
 28 October – Census (population 13,648,270)
 30 October – Maintenance of the famous battleship Yavuz began. 
 3 November – New term of the parliament and the new government of İsmet İnönü
 24 November - Statue of Victory, a monument in Ankara about the Turkish War of Independence (There will be others in the following years)
26 December – Marine accident The ship Sevinç sank

Births
3 January – Nazmiye Demirel, wife Süleyman Demirel (former president)
28 January – Eşref Kolçak, actor
27 March – Coşkun Kırca, academic, politician
22 June – Çetin Altan, journalist
13 July – Orhan Birgit, lawyer, journalist and politician
10 August – Nejat Uygur, theatre actor
13 October – Turgut Özal, president (1989–1993)
8 November – İlter Türkmen, diplomat
10 November – Vedat Dalokay, architect

Deaths
4 January – Süleyman Nazif (born in 1870), poet
2 June – Hüseyin Avni Lifij (born in 1886), painter
13 July - Mimar Kemaleddin Bey (born in 1871), architect

Gallery

References

 
Years of the 20th century in Turkey